Island Lake is a lake in Lyon County, in the U.S. state of Minnesota.

Island Lake was named for its lake island.

See also
List of lakes in Minnesota

References

Lakes of Minnesota
Lakes of Lyon County, Minnesota